The Västberga helicopter robbery occurred on 23 September 2009 at 05:15 CET when a G4S cash service depot was robbed in Västberga in southern Stockholm, Sweden. The robbers used a stolen Bell 206 Jet Ranger as transport and landed on the rooftop of the G4S building. 

The police were unable to use their own helicopters to pursue the robbers since decoy bombs had been placed close to them. A 7-million-Swedish-krona reward was announced the following day for anyone with information that could lead to the arrest of the robbers and/or the return of the stolen goods. This was the first robbery involving a helicopter in Swedish history.

Events of September 23
A Bell 206 helicopter is stolen from Roslagens helicopter base in Norrtälje.
The helicopter arrives at 5:15 (CEST) at the G4S cash service building. Three to four people land on the rooftop and break the reinforced glass window with a sledgehammer. Small bombs go off inside the building, likely to blow security doors open. No people are physically harmed. Bags of money are thereafter loaded into the helicopter. The sum is unknown.
The Swedish police arrive at 05:25 (CEST) but do not intervene, due to reports of the use of submachine guns.
The helicopter takes off from the rooftop at 05:35 (CEST) with all the robbers and the money on board.
Prior to the robbery, caltrops had been placed on the roads around the cash service building to prevent police cars from gaining access and decoy bombs were placed on the police helicopter base at Myttinge on the island of Värmdö.
The helicopter landed at Kanaanbadet.
The helicopter the robbers used is found at 08:15 (CEST) in the woods just outside a field at Skavlöten in Arninge, twenty kilometers north of Stockholm.
Two JAS 39 Gripen were conducting a drill over the Baltic Sea and the Swedish Air Force offered assistance. It was turned down since the robbery was a civilian matter and not a military one.

Subsequent events
Swedish police arrested six male suspects in connection with the robbery. They were listed as being aged 21 to 36, but were otherwise unidentified in accordance with Swedish privacy laws. The Serbian Interior Minister Ivica Dačić claimed that former members of the BIA Red Berets took part in the robbery. One month prior to the robbery, Serbian police informed the Swedish embassy in Belgrade that a criminal group was preparing a robbery in Stockholm, but Swedish authorities apparently failed to act effectively on this information. One out of the seven sentenced men were from Serbia.

Arrests
Swedish police quickly identified and arrested the suspects. Two days after the robbery, Safa Kadhum flew to the Dominican Republic where he was arrested by local law enforcement at the Swedish government's request. Swedish police immediately chartered a private plane to bring him back to Sweden. Alexander Eriksson instead flew to the Canary Islands. He was met at the airport by a special operations unit of the Swedish police. The police identified Goran Bojovic as the one who led the robbery.

Sentences
Seven men were sentenced to prison terms in October 2010 for their participation in the robbery. Three men were cleared of all charges and police suspect that another 10 may have been involved, but their identities are unknown.
Helicopter pilot Alexander Eriksson (Swedish): 8 years' imprisonment
Robber Safa Kadhum (Iraqi): 8 years' imprisonment
Organizer Charbel Charro (Syrian): 5 years' imprisonment
Organizer Mikael Södergran (Swedish): 5 years' imprisonment
Organizer Goran Bojovic (Montenegro): 8 years' imprisonment
Falsified alibi provider Marcus Axelsson (Swedish): 2 years' imprisonment
Falsified alibi provider Tomas Broman (Swedish): 1 year's imprisonment

In popular culture
Swedish public television broadcaster Sveriges Television released a six-part Swedish-language documentary film called Helikopterrånet. Netflix reportedly planned to release a movie based on the robbery with actor Jake Gyllenhaal as the star actor.

After interviewing four of the jailed perpetrators, Swedish-born author Jonas Bonnier published a semi-fictional novel called Helikopterrånet.

References

Crime in Stockholm
2009 crimes in Sweden
Robberies in Sweden
September 2009 crimes
2000s in Stockholm